CTV Morning Live is the name of the local morning newscasts airing on CTV's owned-and-operated stations in Western Canada, specifically, Vancouver, Calgary, Edmonton, Saskatoon, Regina and Winnipeg as well as on CTV 2 stations in Ottawa and Atlantic Canada. Each station produces its own version of the program. In areas where the program airs on a local CTV station, it airs in place of the network's national Your Morning (formerly Canada AM) program.

Local programs

Ottawa 
CTV Morning Live on CHRO Pembroke/Ottawa airs in the Ottawa market. It airs from 6:00-10:00 a.m. weekdays. It also runs a pre-recorded Saturday edition from 7:00-9:00 am. Available over the air on 43.1 or cable channel 6.

Current Hosts:
 Annette Goerner (Host)
 Stefan Keyes (Host)
 Rosey Edeh (Weather/Host)

Former:
 Trisha Owens (News Anchor)
 Angie Poirier
 Sarah Freemark (Live Eye Reporter)
 Lianne Laing 
 Melissa Lamb
 Lois Lee
 Jeff Hopper
 Kurt Stoodley
 Bill Welychka
 Henry Burris (Host)
 Jasmin Ibrahim (Live Eye Reporter)
 Leslie Roberts (Host)

Atlantic Canada
The program in Atlantic Canada airs on CTV 2 Atlantic weekdays from 7-9:00 a.m.

Current Hosts:
 Ana Almeida (Host)
 Amanda Debison (Host)
 Lataevia Beezer (Host/Weather)
 Katie Kelly
 Jennifer Grudić 

Former:
 Heidi Petracek
 Jayson Baxter
 Felicia Yap 
 Tina Simpkin
 Kelly Linehan
 Alyse Hand
 Cyril Lunney
 Heather Butts
 Maria Panopolis

Winnipeg
CTV Morning Live airs on CTV Winnipeg weekdays from 6:00 - 9:00 am, starting September 26, 2011, becoming the first O&O CTV station to have a local morning show.

Current Hosts:
  Nicole Dubé (Host)
  Rachel Lagacé (Host)
  Terri Apostle (unknown)
  Katherine Dow (Weather Anchor)
  Ainsley McPhail (Traffic Reporter)

Former:
 Eleanor Coopsammy 
 Kris Laudien
 Kristin Hursh
 Jesse Carlson
 Alex Brown 
 Rahim Ladhani
 Tara Lopez
 Hugh Headley
 Michael Hutchinson

Regina
CTV Morning Live airs on CTV Regina (also simulcast on CTV Yorkton) weekdays from 6:00 - 9:00 am starting October 31, 2011.

Current Hosts:
 Darrell Romuld (Host) 
 Amandalina Letterio (Host)
 Brandi Boxall (Weather)
 Kayleen Sawatzky (On The Go)

Former:
 Shallima Maharaj (Host)
 Molly Thomas (Host)
 Sabeen Ahmed (Host)
 Chris Hodges (Host)
 Jonathan Glasgow (Host)
 Lindsay Dunn (Traffic & Entertainment Host)
 Jamie Fischer (Traffic & Entertainment Host)
 Carey Smith (Weather Anchor/Community)
 Phil Darlington (Weather Anchor/Community)
 Kahla Buchanan(Weather Anchor/Community)
 Danielle De Graauw (On-The-Go Reporter)
 Paige Kashmere (On-The-Go Reporter)
 Alex Brown (On-The-Go Reporter)
 Jackie Perez (On-The-Go Reporter)
 Jaden Lee-Lincoln (On The Go)
 Jessica Smith (Weather Anchor)
 Lataevia Beezer (Weather Anchor)
 Brit Dort (Host)
 Matt Hamel (Weather)

Saskatoon
CTV Morning Live airs on CTV Saskatoon (also simulcast on CTV Prince Albert) weekdays from 6:00 - 9:00 am starting October 31, 2011.

Current Hosts:
 Stephanie Massicotte (Host)
 Alex Brown (Host)
 Mike Ciona (Weather Anchor/Community)
 Caitrin Hodson (Reporter)
Former
 Maleeha Sheikh
 Shallima Maharaj 
 Andera Bain
 Jeremy Dodge
 Janella Hamilton

Calgary
CTV Morning Live on CTV Calgary began on October 24, 2011, and will air weekdays from 5:30 - 9:00 a.m.

Current Hosts:
 Jefferson Humphreys (Host)
 Joelle Tomlinson (Host)
 Courtney Stanfield (nee Ketchen)  (Traffic)
 Ryan Harding (Weather)
Former:
 Aisling Tomei (Host)
 Bill Macfarlane (Host)
 Andrea Dion (Traffic)
 Brittney Matejka (Traffic)
 Kelsey McEwen (Weather)
 Pearl Tsang 
 Todd Gallant (Weather)
 Kevin Stanfield (Weather)

Edmonton
CTV Morning Live on CTV Edmonton began on October 24, 2011, and will air weekdays from 5:30 - 9:00 a.m.

Current Hosts:
 Kent Morrison (Anchor)
 Ziyah Karmali (Anchor)
 Cory Edel (meteorologist)
 Nahreman Issa (morning live reporter)
 Carla Turner (traffic specialist)
Former:
 Stacey Brotzel (Anchor)
 Rob Williams (Anchor)
 Jesse Beyer (meteorologist)
 Melissa Dominelli
 Dez Melenka
 Jennifer Dolynchuk
 Jonathan Glasgow
 Jordan Hertner (traffic specialist)
 Kimberly Wynn (traffic specialist)

Vancouver
CTV Morning Live began airing on CTV Vancouver on November 14, 2011, broadcasting weekdays from 5:30 - 9:00 a.m.

Current Hosts:
 Keri Adams (Host)
 Jason Pires (Host)
 Marke Driesschen (Weather)
 Cristina Carpio (Traffic)
Former:
 Aamer Haleem
 Ann Luu
 Kimberly Wynn
 Norma Reid
 Sonia Beeksma
 Luisa Alvarez
 Krissy Vann

References

Television morning shows in Canada
2011 Canadian television series debuts
CTV News
CTV Television Network original programming
CTV 2 original programming
Television series by Bell Media
Television shows filmed in Calgary
Television shows filmed in Edmonton
Television shows filmed in Halifax, Nova Scotia
Television shows filmed in Ottawa
Television shows filmed in Regina, Saskatchewan
Television shows filmed in Saskatoon
Television shows filmed in Vancouver
Television shows filmed in Winnipeg
2010s Canadian television news shows
2020s Canadian television news shows